Raymond Francis Kuffel (born December 9, 1921 – December 22, 1974)
was an American football player in the All-America Football Conference for the Buffalo Bills and Chicago Rockets/Hornets from 1947 to 1949 as an end. He played at the collegiate level at Marquette University and the University of Notre Dame.

References

External links

1921 births
1974 deaths
Buffalo Bills (AAFC) players
Chicago Hornets players
Chicago Rockets players
Marquette Golden Eagles men's basketball players
Notre Dame Fighting Irish football players
Basketball players from Milwaukee
Players of American football from Milwaukee
American men's basketball players